New World sparrows are a group of mainly New World passerine birds, forming the family Passerellidae. They are seed-eating birds with conical bills, brown or gray in color, and many species have distinctive head patterns.

Although they share the name sparrow, New World sparrows are more closely related to Old World buntings than they are to the Old World sparrows (family Passeridae). New World sparrows are also similar in both appearance and habit to finches, with which they sometimes used to be classified.

Taxonomy
The genera now assigned to the family Passerellidae were previously included with the buntings in the family Emberizidae. A phylogenetic analysis of nuclear and mitochondrial DNA sequences published in 2015 found that the Passerellidae formed a monophyletic group that had an uncertain relationship to the Emberizidae. Emberizidae was therefore split and the family Passerellidae resurrected. It had originally been introduced, as the subfamily Passerellinae, by the German ornithologist Jean Cabanis in 1851.

The International Ornithological Congress (IOC) recognizes 138 species in the family, distributed among these 30 genera. For more detail, see list of New World sparrow species.

Passerellidae

Below is a phylogeny based on a 2016 study by Robert Bryson and colleagues.

Morphology
Being a member of Emberizoidea, New World sparrows have only nine easily visible primary feathers on each wing (they also have a 10th primary, but it is greatly reduced and largely concealed). Despite their name, not all of the New World sparrows resemble the typical image of a sparrow. Species in the neotropics tend to be much larger with bold patterns of greens, reds, yellows, and grays. Those in the Nearctic realm are smaller, with brown bodies streaked and with some head patterns. Some even have sexual dimorphism such as the lark bunting and eastern towhee.

Habitat and distribution
The New World sparrows are found throughout in the Americas, from their breeding ranges in the Arctic tundra of North America to their year-round ranges in the Southern Cone of South America. Given this huge expansive range, many species occupy different habitats such as grasslands, rainforests, temperate forests, and deserts and xeric shrublands. Those that breed in the northern parts of North America, such as the white-throated sparrow and Lincoln's sparrow, migrate further southward into the continent during the winter, while others like the dark-eyed junco have been able to adapt to staying all year-round in some areas of North America. Most North American passerellid species usually migrate short distances. Some of the Southern Cone species move northward during autumn. In the breeding season, sparrows of different species form small-to-medium flocks, as they do when foraging in the non-breeding season.

Gallery

Notes

References

External links
American Sparrow videos, photos and sounds on the Internet Bird Collection

American sparrow

American sparrow
Songbirds
Bird common names
Bird families
Passeroidea
American sparrow